Esa Seeste (4 July 1913 in Vyborg – 2 October 1997 in Helsinki) was a Finnish gymnast who competed in the 1936 Summer Olympics.

References

1913 births
1997 deaths
Finnish male artistic gymnasts
Olympic gymnasts of Finland
Gymnasts at the 1936 Summer Olympics
Olympic bronze medalists for Finland
Olympic medalists in gymnastics
Medalists at the 1936 Summer Olympics
20th-century Finnish people